Temenos may refer to:

Temenos, a piece of land cut off and assigned as an official domain or a piece of land marked off from common uses and dedicated to a god
Temenos of Samothrace,  one of the principal Pan-Hellenic religious sanctuaries
Temenos Academy, an educational charity in London
Temenos Academy Review, a journal published in London by the Temenos Academy
Temenos, Greece, a former municipality in the Heraklion regional unit of Crete
Temenos Group, a software company
Temenos (Here Come the Shakes), a Remy Zero song
Temenos, a public sculpture in the Tees Valley Giants series in Middlesbrough, England